Gayatri Joshi is an Indian actress, video jockey and former model in Hindi films. She starred in the 2004 film Swades, her only acting credit to date. She is married to businessman Vikas Oberoi since 2005.

Career 
Joshi started her career by becoming a video jockey on Channel V India. She then left to pursue her dream of winning the Femina India beauty pageant. Joshi was one of the final five candidates in the 1999 Femina Miss India beauty pageant, and was crowned on Sony Entertainment Channel through voting by viewers, and was chosen to represent India at the 2000 Miss International event in Japan. She has worked as an advertising model in addition to making appearances in several music videos: She appeared in music videos of Jagjit Singh's "Kaghaz Ki Kashti" and Hans Raj Hans' "Jhanjaria".

While still attending college, she modelled for Bombay Dyeing, Philips, Pond's, Godrej, Sunsilk and LG, as well as Hyundai advertisements with Shah Rukh Khan. She has also modelled for the Seasons Catalogue and Calendar during 2001. She made her Bollywood film debut in December 2004 with Ashutosh Gowarikar's Swades, opposite Shahrukh and Kishori Ballal, which received strong acclaim from Indian film critics.

Filmography

Personal life and education 
Joshi studied at Mount Carmel High School in Nagpur, and when the family re-located to Mumbai, she was enrolled in the J. B. Vachha High School. After completing her schooling, she went on to study in Sydenham College. She modelled for brands such as Godrej, LG, Ponds, Bombay Dyeing, Sunsilk, Philips, as well as with Shah Rukh Khan in Hyundai advertisements. She then went on to obtain a degree in Commerce from the same college.

She was one of the five finalists of the 1999 Femina Miss India Contest. Later She was crowned Miss India International 2000 and represented India at the Miss International 2000 beauty pageant in Japan.
Subsequently, she returned to modelling and appeared in the Seasons Catalogue and Calendar during the year 2001.

On 27 August 2005, she married Vikas Oberoi, a promoter of Oberoi Construction and left the film industry devoting her life to her family.

Awards 
 2005, Bollywood Movie Awards, Best Female Debut
 2005, Star Screen Award Most Promising Newcomer - Female, Swades.
 2005, Zee Cine Award Best Female Debut, Swades.
 2005, Global Indian Film Awards, Best Newcomer, Swades

References

External links 

 

Year of birth missing (living people)
Living people
Actresses from Nagpur
Female models from Maharashtra
Indian film actresses
21st-century Indian actresses
Actresses in Hindi cinema
Femina Miss India winners
Screen Awards winners
Zee Cine Awards winners